Andrey Gurov (born 11 January 1975), is a Kazakhstani sport shooter who competed in the 2004 Summer Olympics.

References

1975 births
Living people
Kazakhstani male sport shooters
Running target shooters
Sportspeople from Almaty
Olympic shooters of Kazakhstan
Shooters at the 2004 Summer Olympics
Shooters at the 2002 Asian Games
Shooters at the 2006 Asian Games
Shooters at the 2010 Asian Games
Shooters at the 2014 Asian Games
Asian Games medalists in shooting
Asian Games gold medalists for Kazakhstan
Asian Games bronze medalists for Kazakhstan
Medalists at the 2002 Asian Games
Medalists at the 2006 Asian Games
Medalists at the 2010 Asian Games
Medalists at the 2014 Asian Games
21st-century Kazakhstani people
20th-century Kazakhstani people